Aislinn Hunter (born 1969 in Belleville, Ontario) is a Canadian poetry and fiction author.

She studied art history and writing at the University of Victoria where she received her Bachelor of Fine Arts degree. Her Master of Fine Arts degree came from the University of British Columbia, her MSc in Writing and Cultural Politics came from the University of Edinburgh as did her PhD where she wrote on writers' houses/museums and resonant things with a focus on the Victorian era and thing theory via Heidegger. She currently teaches Creative Writing part-time at Kwantlen Polytechnic University. Hunter's research interests include material culture, museums, books-as-things, Victorian writers and ephemera.

Her 2002 novel Stay was adapted for film by Wiebke Von Carolsfeld and released as a Telefilm / Irish Film Board co-production in 2013, premiering at the Toronto International Film Festival. It stars Aidan Quinn and Taylor Schilling.
Her novel, The World Before Us, set in a UK museum, was published by Doubleday, Canada in 2014 and by Hamish Hamilton in the UK, Hogarth Press in the US, and Marchand de Feuilles in Quebec. It won the 2015 Ethel Wilson Fiction Prize and was a New York Times Editor's Choice Book, an NPR 'Best Book' and a Chatelaine Book Club pick.

In the spring of 2017 her third book of poetry, Linger, Still, was published by Gaspereau Press. It won the Fred Cogswell Award for Excellence in Poetry and was long-listed for the Pat Lowther Poetry Prize.

Dr Hunter was selected to be a Canadian War Artist and in 2018 she worked with the Canadian Armed Forces and with NATO Forces at CFB Suffield.

Her novel The Certainties is due out in 2020 with Knopf Canada.

She was married for 25 years but lost her husband to brain cancer in 2018. She lives in Vancouver, British Columbia.

Bibliography
 2001: Into the Early Hours (Polestar) 
 2001: What's Left Us (Raincoast) 
 French translation by Carole Noël: Ce qu'il nous reste 
 2002: Stay (Raincoast) 
 2004: The Possible Past (Polestar) 
 2009: A Peepshow with Views of the Interior (lyric essays) (Palimpsest Press, Fall, 2009) 
 2014: The World Before Us (Doubleday) 
 2017: Linger, Still (Gaspereau Press) 
 2020: The Certainties

Awards and recognition
 1996: nominee, Journey Prize (poetry)
 1996: nominee, National Book Award (fiction)
 2000: nominee, National Magazine Award 
 2002: winner, Gerald Lampert Award, Into the Early Hours
 2002: shortlisted, Danuta Gleed Award, What's Left Us
 2002: finalist, Dorothy Livesay Poetry Prize, Into the Early Hours
 2003: finalist, Books in Canada/Amazon First Novel Award, Stay
 2002: shortlisted, ReLit Award, What's Left Us
 2004: shortlisted, Dorothy Livesay Poetry Prize, The Possible Past
 2004: shortlisted, Pat Lowther Award, The Possible Past
 2004: shortlisted, ReLit Prize for Poetry, The Possible Past
 2015: winner, The Ethel Wilson Fiction Prize, The World Before Us
 2017: winner, Fred Cogswell Award for Excellence in Poetry

External links
 Aislinn Hunter official website

References 

1969 births
Living people
Canadian women novelists
Canadian women poets
Writers from Belleville, Ontario
Writers from Vancouver
University of British Columbia alumni
University of Victoria alumni
Alumni of the University of Edinburgh
Academic staff of the Kwantlen Polytechnic University
21st-century Canadian novelists
20th-century Canadian poets
21st-century Canadian poets
20th-century Canadian women writers
21st-century Canadian women writers